Molinges is a commune in the Jura department in Bourgogne-Franche-Comté in eastern France. On 1 January 2019, it was merged into the new commune Chassal-Molinges.

See also 
 Communes of the Jura department

References 

Former communes of Jura (department)
Populated places disestablished in 2019